Obaidullah Ramin (born 27 September 1952, in Baghlan Province) is a politician in Afghanistan and was appointed the country's Minister of Agriculture in December 2004. After his two term as the Minister of Agriculture, Obaidullah Ramin ran a successful campaign and is appointed a current Member of National Assembly.  He is a member of Parliament representing the Baghlan Province.

Mohammad Asef Rahimi, was appointed Minister on October 11, 2008.

References

External links
Biography of H.E. Obaidullah Ramin

Living people
1952 births
Agriculture ministers of Afghanistan
Government ministers of Afghanistan